1-Octanol, also known as octan-1-ol, is the organic compound with the molecular formula CH3(CH2)7OH. It is a fatty alcohol. Many other isomers are also known generically as octanols.  1-Octanol is manufactured for the synthesis of esters for use in perfumes and flavorings. It has a pungent odor.  Esters of octanol, such as octyl acetate, occur as components of essential oils. It is used to evaluate the lipophilicity of  pharmaceutical products.

Preparation
Octanol is mainly produced industrially by the oligomerization of ethylene using triethylaluminium followed by oxidation of the alkylaluminium products.  This route is known as the Ziegler alcohol synthesis.  An idealized synthesis is shown:
Al(C2H5)3  +  9 C2H4   →  Al(C8H17)3
Al(C8H17)3 +  3 O  +  3 H2O  →  3 HOC8H17  +  Al(OH)3
The process generates a range of alcohols, which can be separated by distillation.

The Kuraray process defines an alternative route to 1-octanol, but using C4 + C4 building strategy.  1,3-Butadiene is dimerized concomitant with the addition of one molecule of water.  This conversion is catalyzed by palladium complexes.  The resulting doubly unsaturated alcohol is then hydrogenated.

Water/octanol partitioning

Octanol and water are immiscible.  The distribution of a compound between water and octanol is used to calculate the partition coefficient, P, of that molecule (often expressed as its logarithm to the base 10, log P).  Water/octanol partitioning is a relatively good approximation of the partitioning between the cytosol and lipid membranes of living systems.

Many dermal absorption models consider the stratum corneum/ water partition coefficient to be well approximated by a function of the water/octanol partition coefficient of the form:

The values of a and b vary between papers, but Cleek & Bunge have reported the values a = 0, b = 0.74.

Properties and uses
With a flash point of 81 °C, 1-octanol is not seriously flammable, though its autoignition temperature is as low as 245 °C. 1-Octanol is mainly consumed as a precursor to perfumes.  It has been examined for controlling essential tremor and other types of involuntary neurological tremors because evidence indicates it can relieve tremor symptoms at lower doses than are required to obtain a similar level of symptomatic relief from consumption of ethanol, thereby reducing the risk alcohol intoxication at therapeutic dosages.

1-Octanol hydrogen bonds to Lewis bases. It is a Lewis acid  in the ECW model and its acid parameters are EA = 0.85 and C A = 0.87.

See also
 2-Octanol

References

Fatty alcohols
Primary alcohols
Alkanols